Stephen Hesford (born 27 May 1957) is a British Labour politician and barrister who served as the Member of Parliament (MP) for Wirral West from 1997 to 2010.

Early life
Born in Lowton St Mary's, near Leigh, Lancashire, Hesford was educated at Urmston Grammar School. In 1978, he received a BSc in Social Science from the University of Bradford, and earned an LLM at the Polytechnic of Central London in 1980.

Hesford was called to the bar at Gray's Inn in 1981 and worked as a criminal law barrister in Altrincham, Cheshire until his election to Parliament.

Parliamentary career
Hesford was an assistant to Joan Lestor, Labour MP for Eccles, in 1992, and unsuccessfully contested South Suffolk in the general election of the same year.

He was elected to the House of Commons at the 1997 General Election for Wirral West, defeating former Cabinet minister David Hunt with a 13.8% swing. Making his maiden speech on 3 July 1997, Hesford recalled a constituency predecessor and former House Speaker Selwyn Lloyd.

Hesford served on the Northern Ireland Affairs Committee from 1998 to 2000, and the Health and Social Care Committee from 1999 to 2001 and again from 2007 to 2010. He was appointed Parliamentary Private Secretary (PPS) to Valerie Amos, Leader of the House of Lords, after the 2005 General Election until September 2006. Serving as PPS to Vera Baird, Solicitor General, he resigned in September 2009 in protest over Baroness Scotland remaining as Attorney General after breaking employment laws.

On 23 January 2010, Hesford announced that he would not stand at the 2010 general election for "family reasons".

Personal life
Hesford married Elizabeth Anne Henshall in 1984, with whom he has two sons. He is a member of the Fabian Society and the Lancashire County Cricket Club.

Since leaving Parliament, he has become a guest lecturer at the University of Chester.

References

External links
 Guardian Unlimited Politics - Ask Aristotle: Stephen Hesford MP
 TheyWorkForYou.com - Stephen Hesford MP
 BBC Politics Profile

1957 births
Living people
Alumni of the University of Bradford
Alumni of the University of Westminster
English barristers
Labour Party (UK) MPs for English constituencies
Members of Gray's Inn
People educated at Urmston Grammar
People from Lowton
Politics of the Metropolitan Borough of Wirral
UK MPs 1997–2001
UK MPs 2001–2005
UK MPs 2005–2010